It Could Be Yours may refer to:
 "It Could Be Yours", a 2003 song by Blackmail from the album Friend or Foe?
 "It Could Be Yours", a 2005 song by the Bratz Rock Angelz from the album Rock Angelz